A by-election was held for the New South Wales Legislative Assembly electorate of Central Cumberland on 31 August 1877 because the seats of William Long and John Lackey were declared vacant as they had been appointed to positions in the fourth Robertson ministry. Long was appointed Colonial Treasurer, and Lackey was appointed Minister of Justice and Public Instruction. Such ministerial by-elections were usually uncontested however on this occasion, only Thomas Garrett (Camden) and Ezekiel Baker (Goldfields South) were unopposed. While the other ministers, John Robertson (West Sydney), John Davies (East Sydney) and Edward Combes (Orange) were opposed, all were re-elected.

Dates

Result

The by-election was caused by the appointment of William Long and John Lackey to positions in the fourth Robertson ministry.

See also
Electoral results for the district of Central Cumberland
List of New South Wales state by-elections

Notes

References

1877 elections in Australia
New South Wales state by-elections
1870s in New South Wales